Archery at the 2021 Islamic Solidarity Games  will held in Konya, Turkey from 14 to 18 August 2022. Traditional Turkish Archery Competitions will be held at Saraçoglu Sports Venue between 15 and 16 August 2022. For individual competitions, qualification, elimination and final elimination round shots will be done, and for team competitions, elimination and final elimination rounds of the teams will be done. Qualification rounds in Archery will be made accordingly: Men’s and Women’s Recurve bow will be 70m. 720 rounds, and Men’s and Women’s Compound bow will be 50m. 720 Rounds. Para Archery competitions will be held in Saraçoğlu Sport Complex between 09-13 August 2022. Competitions will be held in  Recurve Bow, Compound Bow and W1 Bows will be held in Senior category. The qualification rounds of the competition will be done as 720 rounds 70 m for Recurve bows, and 720 rounds 50 m for Compound Bows. Individual elimination and final rounds will be done in each category after qualification rounds.

Medal table

Medal summary

Recurve

Compound

Traditional Turkish archery

Medalists

Men

Women

Medal table

Para Archery

Medal table

Recurve Bow

Compound Bow

Participating nations

Archery
139 archer from 26 countries:

Traditional Turkish archery
A total of 46 athletes from 9 nations competed in Traditional Turkish archery at the 2021 Islamic Solidarity Games:

Para Archery
47 archer from 7 countries:

References

External links
Official website
Results
Results – Para Archery
 Results Book – Archery
Results Book – Para Archery
Results Book – Traditional Turkish Archery

2021 Islamic Solidarity Games
Islamic Solidarity Games
2021
International archery competitions hosted by Turkey